Kankumbi  is a village in Belgaum district of Karnataka, India, near the north-eastern part of the Goa-Karnataka border. It is situated in the cradle of the Western Ghats. It lies to the east of Valpoy, Goa.  
Konkani and Marathi is spoken here.

History
There are few Chardo families in this area as they had migrated due to the persecution of the Portuguese in Goa. Shree Mauli Devi Temple is situated in R.S.No 127 of village of Kankumbi and it is known as a pilgrimage center from the times of mythological origins. The Malaprabha river is in Kanakumbi village.  The town has more than 5000 people. There are five hotels, including Malaprabha Megharaj.

The big festivals celebrated in the village are Shigmo, Divali, Chavathi, and other Hindu festivals.

See also

Villages in Belagavi district